Cecil "Sam" Cook (23 August 1921 – 4 September 1996) was an English first-class cricketer who played for Gloucestershire County Cricket Club and in one Test match for the England cricket team.

Life and career
Born in Tetbury, Gloucestershire, Cook was a small and stocky slow left-arm spinner, who emerged unexpectedly after World War II when Gloucestershire had lost Tom Goddard’s former partner Reg Sinfield. Wally Hammond saw him in the nets during the spring, and took Cook on immediately with great expectations that were amply fulfilled. Cook, who was never known by his given name, took a wicket with his first ball in first-class cricket, and 133 wickets in the 1946 season, when he played in the Test Trial. Not a great spinner of the ball, Cook relied on accuracy and flight: if he lacked penetration as a bowler, he was also very rarely mastered. In the following year with the Bristol pitch – which had caused little satisfaction for its tendency to be either a spinners’ (as in 1939) or a batsman's (as in 1946) paradise – being reconditioned with a sand dressing, Cook offered superb support to Goddard to form the most difficult bowling attack in the country. Cook was called into the England team to play the South Africans on a batting pitch at Trent Bridge in 1947, after taking six South African wickets in the second innings of the Marylebone Cricket Club (MCC) match in May. However, in the Test match, he took no wickets for 127 runs, scored 0 and 4, and was never picked again. The Kent fast bowler Jack Martin, who had done equally well in the MCC match, was also picked for the Trent Bridge Test, also fared badly, and was likewise discarded, never to appear in Test cricket again. In 1948, with the Bristol pitch dressed with loam instead of sand, Cook declined considerably and never threatened the superbly-skilled Australian batsmen, and it took him till August, 1949 to recapture any sort of form.

Cook took 139 wickets in 1950, but by this time Johnny Wardle, Malcolm Hilton and later Tony Lock – all far better batsmen and fielders were able to prevent him from having the slightest chance of returning to Test cricket. Owing to the loss of Goddard, Cook faltered a little between 1951 and 1955, but the very wet summer and dry spring of 1956 allowed him to form a devastating combination with Bomber Wells that led Cook to his best season ever with 149 wickets for less than fifteen runs apiece, including an amazing ten for 35 against Worcestershire and thirteen for 121 against Nottinghamshire. The following two seasons were moderate, but with the newly found spinning riches of John Mortimore and David Allen, Gloucestershire acquired the most formidable bowling attack in the country during the brilliant summer of 1959, with Cook "making full use of his wealth of experience". In this period Gloucestershire, as in the days of Parker, Goddard and Sinfield, often played three spinners, right up to the time when Cook retired in 1964. However, despite heading the first-class bowling averages for the only time in 1962, Cook's extreme weakness with the bat and in the field saw him left out for many matches even in that season and on grassier pitches the switch in emphasis to seam bowling made things even tougher for Cook as he grew older.

In all first-class cricket, Cook took 1,782 wickets. Not known for his batting skills, he scored a meagre fewer than 2,000 first-class runs and never reached 40 in an innings. After retirement, he stood as a first-class umpire until 1986.

Sam Cook died in his hometown of Tetbury in September 1996, at the age of 75.

References

External links

1921 births
1996 deaths
English cricket umpires
England Test cricketers
Gloucestershire cricketers
English cricketers
People from Tetbury
Marylebone Cricket Club cricketers
North v South cricketers
West of England cricketers
Sportspeople from Gloucestershire